Events from the year 1941 in Argentina

Incumbents
 President: Roberto María Ortiz (officially), Ramón Castillo (acting)
 Vice president: Ramón Castillo

Governors
 Buenos Aires Province: 
 until 1 February: Octavio R. Amadeo
 1 February-10 February: Eduardo T. López
 10 February-1 September: Eleazar Videla
 1 September-13 September: Enrique Rottjer
 starting 13 September: Dimas González Gowland
 Cordoba: Santiago del Castillo
 Mendoza Province: Rodolfo Corominas Segura (until 18 February); Adolfo Vicchi (from 18 February)

Vice Governors
 Buenos Aires Province: vacant

Events

January
 The UCR does not support in the Congress the proposal of the Minister of the Economy, Federico Pinedo, who resigns.

February
 President Roberto Ortiz, during leave from work because of diabetes, condemns the electoral fraud promoted by his vice president and acting president, Ramón Castillo.

March
 The fourth Mar del Plata chess tournament is held in Mar del Plata.

April

May

June
June 4 - Premiere of the Los martes, orquídeas film, first film featuring Mirtha Legrand

July
July 5 - The Avenida General Paz freeway is opened to traffic.
July 12 - The Cathedral of Tucuman is declared a National Historic Monument.

August

September
 A coup attempt fails. General Zuloaga, from the air forces, is demoted.

October
October 9 - Creation of the Dirección General de Fabricaciones Militares.
 New military rebellion, requesting the demotion of general Agustín Pedro Justo
 Creation of the National Geographic Institute

November
November 23 - The Buenos Aires Grand Prix is held at the Circuito Retiro, and is won by José Canziani.

December
 Conservative candidate Rodolfo Moreno prevails in the elections in Buenos Aires. The opposition denounces electoral fraud.
 River Plate wins the 1941 Argentine Primera División tournament.

Date unknown
Uruguayan architect Mauricio Cravotto wins a competition for the master plan for the city of Mendoza.

Ongoing
 Argentina keeps a neutral stance in World War II, amid foreign pressure to join the war.

Births
January 1 – Dardo Cabo, journalist and activist (died c.1977)
January 22 – Sergio Calligaris, pianist and composer
February 6 – Guillermo Obeid, Olympic fencer
February 5 – Juan Carlos Morrone, footballer and manager
March 8 – Palito Ortega, singer and actor
March 9 – Antonio Gasalla, actor, comedian, and theatre director
May 14 – Lito Cruz, stage director and motion picture actor
May 27 – Jorge Eduardo Acosta, naval officer involved in the "Dirty War"
June 5 – Martha Argerich, pianist
June 10
Oscar Bony, artist (died 2002)
Graciela Borges, actress
Enrique Liporace, actor
July 14 – León Najnudel, basketball player and coach (died 1998)
July 15 – Rodolfo Enrique Fogwill, sociologist and writer (died 2010)
August 4 – Aníbal Tarabini, footballer (died 1997)
August 20 – Luisa Peluffo, journalist
August 23 – Rafael Albrecht, footballer
September 15 – Mario Paolucci, actor (died 2008)
September 28 – Juan José Jusid, film director and screenwriter
October 2 – Héctor Cavallero, politician
October 5 – Eduardo Duhalde, businessman
October 9 – Alfredo Coto, businessman
October 18 – Enrique Gorriarán Merlo, guerrilla insurgency leader (died 2006)
October 28 – Pacho O'Donnell, writer, politician and physician
November 4 
Raúl Bernao, footballer (died 2007)
Carlos Espósito, football referee
November 11 – Jorge Solari, football player and manager
November 24 
Horacio Altuna, comic artist
Ricardo Piglia, writer
November 30 – León Arslanián, lawyer, jurist and public official
December 4 – Raul Blanco, football coach
December 16 – Poldy Bird, writer
December 17 – Thelma Biral, actress
December 25 – Rómulo Antonio Braschi, Roman Catholic bishop
date unknown
Néstor Braunstein, psychiatrist
Guillermo Calvo, economist
David Graiver, businessman and banker (died 1976)
Antonio Ottone, film director, screenwriter and film producer (died 2002)
Liliana Porter, artist

Deaths
August 13 - Agustín Bardi, tango musician (born 1884)
August 14 - Luis delle Piane, civil engineer, militarist and politician (born 1865 
September 14 - Juan Bautista Bailoretto, outlaw (born 1894; shot in police ambush)
December 29 - Rómulo Sebastián Naón, lawyer, politician and diplomat (born 1875)

See also
List of Argentine films of 1941

References

Bibliography
 

 
Years of the 20th century in Argentina